Stanton Williams is a British architectural design practice based in Islington, London.

The studio was founded by Alan Stanton and Paul Williams in 1985 and now has a team of over 85 people with four principal directors, two associate directors and fifteen associates. Stanton Williams has completed over 350 architectural, urban design, masterplanning, exhibition and interior design projects, winning more than 100 awards. In 2012 their Sainsbury Laboratory in Cambridge was awarded the Stirling Prize. 

Paul Williams is the first design-trained architect to be registered with ARB and received an Honorary Doctorate from the University of the Arts London in 2012. Alan Stanton was elected a Royal Academician in 2009 and both Alan and Paul are both Royal Designers of Industry, They each received an OBE for their services to architecture in 2014.

The practice has developed its portfolio from an initial focus on museums and galleries towards a wide variety of projects, all of which demonstrate its overarching objective of putting the user's experience of space, light and materials at the forefront of the agenda, as well as creating places that sensitively respond to their cultural, social and physical context.

Projects
Current projects include: UCL East Marshgate, a new university campus in the Queen Elizabeth Olympic Park; the Royal Opera House's ‘Open Up' project; a research building for Great Ormond Street Hospital; and the British Museum's Albukhary Foundation Gallery of the Islamic World.

Recently completed projects include: The Simon Sainsbury Centre at Cambridge Judge Business School; the Musée d'arts de Nantes in France, one of the largest Fine Art museums outside Paris; and Key Worker Housing at Eddington in the North West Cambridge development (2019).

Other notable projects include: The Stirling Prize-winning Sainsbury Laboratory in Cambridge; Tintagel House in Vauxhall; Victoria Hall King's Cross; Compton Verney Art Gallery; and Eton Manor, designed for the London 2012 Olympics and the 1990's refurbishment of London's National Theatre.

Publications
A Walk Around King's Cross: Volume 1
Ed. Ruth Slavid
The Architect’s Journal / EMAP publishing, 2014

The Sainsbury Laboratory: Science, Architecture, Art
Stephen Day, John Parker, Steve Rose
Black Dog Publishing, Year 2011

Stanton Williams: Volume
Stephen Bayley, Irenee Scalbert, David Taylor
Black Dog Publishing, 2009

Stanton Williams 
De aedibus international Volume 1
Ed. Heinz Wirzn
Quart Verlag, 2009

Teaching, lectures and mentoring
A number of Stanton Williams’ architects and designers are teachers, guest lecturers and external examiners at schools of architecture and creative arts universities. 

The Principal Directors have acted as external examiners at Westminster, Plymouth, Dundee, Birmingham Schools of Architecture, the Architectural Association, Kingston University, University of East London, Oxford Brookes University, Glasgow School of Art and University of Greenwich. They have held teaching and visiting critic roles at London Metropolitan University, Westminster University, Central Saint Martins MA Creative Practice for Narrative Environments and the Ecole Polytechnique de Lausanne in Switzerland.

Alan Stanton is a trustee of Open-City. Paul Williams is an advisor to the Royal Borough of Kensington and Chelsea and St Paul's Cathedral. He is a trustee of Space Studios and also sits on the RIBA Public Education Committee. The practice supports the Open-City Education Fund, and takes part in Open-City's architectural education programmes ‘Architecture in Schools’ and ‘Accelerate into University’.
 
Stanton Williams offers support and mentoring to architectural students at Central Saint Martins (via the RIBA London Student Mentoring scheme), University of Greenwich, University of East London and the Bartlett School of Architecture.

References

External links
 Stanton Williams website

Architecture firms based in London
Stirling Prize laureates
Design companies established in 1985
1985 establishments in England